Hasani Pachor (also Romanized as Ḩasanī Pachor; also known as Ḩasanī and Ḩasanī Pāichor) is a village in Doshman Ziari Rural District, Doshman Ziari District, Mamasani County, Fars Province, Iran. At the 2006 census, its population was 397, in 91 families.

References 

Populated places in Mamasani County